Miroslav Pavlov (born 22 August 1956) is a Slovak boxer. He competed in the men's welterweight event at the 1980 Summer Olympics.

References

1956 births
Living people
Welterweight boxers
Slovak male boxers
Czechoslovak male boxers
Olympic boxers of Czechoslovakia
Boxers at the 1980 Summer Olympics
People from Topoľčany District
Sportspeople from the Nitra Region